"Doxy" is an early composition by jazz saxophonist Sonny Rollins. It was originally recorded by Rollins with Miles Davis in 1954, and appeared on the 10-inch LP Miles Davis with Sonny Rollins. It was also included on the 1957 Davis album Bags' Groove. The original recording features Davis on trumpet, Rollins on tenor saxophone, Horace Silver on piano, Percy Heath on bass, and Kenny Clarke on drums. When Rollins eventually established his own record label, he named it Doxy Records.  The chords are from Bob Carleton's 16-bar song "Ja-Da".

"Doxy" has become a jazz standard, a frequently performed and recorded part of many musicians' repertoires. "Doxy" was written by Sonny Rollins during his stopover in England on a European tour. Its name is given after a bread-spread that the band was eating in the hotel.

References

1950s jazz standards
Hard bop jazz standards
Jazz compositions in B-flat major
Jazz songs